The 2002 State of Origin series saw the 21st time that the annual three-game series between the Queensland and New South Wales representative rugby league football teams was played entirely under 'state of origin' selection rules. It was the second drawn series in four years and being the second default title retention by Queensland, it ignited protests from the New South Wales camp eventually accepted by the NRL, for the introduction of extra-time to State of Origin matches was introduced to ensure a definitive result.



Game I

A young and enthusiastic New South Wales side proved far too good for their older opponents when they ran away with a 32–4 win in game I. The result suggested a bright future for the Blues who unearthed a number of new stars in fullback Brett Hodgson, centre Jamie Lyon and forwards Luke Bailey, Steve Simpson and Australian Test hooker Danny Buderus. Lyon showed his worth early with a remarkable try in the 24th minute off an Andrew Johns grubber kick on halfway.

Johns was named man of the match but it was Hodgson who stood tall after many had questioned the ability of the diminutive fullback to withstand the physical demands of Origin. The Parramatta Eels fullback ran for a record 390 metres - more than twice that of any other player on the field - and capped his night with an 80-metre run from the scrumbase to score under the posts.

Game II
Queensland winger, Lote Tuqiri was charged with a dangerous throw in an NRL match and was left off the Queensland team sheet so he could plead guilty at the judiciary, allowing him to serve his ban on the Friday and be available for Game II the following Wednesday.

In a typical Origin script, Queensland managed to reverse the result in game II with a thrilling display to level the series. In a disastrous debut, Maroons centre Justin Hodges emulated the feat of New South Wales' Phil Duke of twenty years earlier when he gathered a Johns kick in the 27th minute and fired a pass in goal to Darren Lockyer, only to see the ball sail over Lockyer's head and Blues five-eighth Braith Anasta pounce to give his side the lead. Then in the 61st minute Hodges did it again for Luke Ricketson to score before he was eventually hauled from the field by coach Wayne Bennett as his confidence dropped.

On the other side of the field, Queensland centre Chris McKenna was playing the match of his life as he assisted winger Lote Tuqiri to a three-try haul.

Game III

It was in this match that Gorden Tallis performed a famous tackle on Blues fullback, Brett Hodgson, dragging and eventually tossing him out of the field of play by the collar like a rag-doll. In a dramatic end to one of the most exciting series in years, the Blues thought they'd stolen the game when Jason Moodie finished off a magnificent team movement with three minutes remaining to take an 18–14 lead. But Queensland back-rower Dane Carlaw's try leveled the score at 18-all after a dramatic 50-metre burst, ensuring the title stayed with the Maroons.

Queensland skipper Gorden Tallis' reaction in giving the one-finger salute to a section of the crowd, right behind the northern tryline where Carlaw's try was scored, became a major after-match talking point. Tallis gained some sympathy when it was revealed that he was objecting to an offensive sign about his mother. But many again raised questions about his capacity to captain Australia with debate raging over the choice between Tallis or Andrew Johns to succeed Brad Fittler. Days later Johns was chosen to lead Australia in the July Test against Great Britain.

New South Wales squad

Queensland squad

See also
2002 NRL season

Sources
 Big League's 25 Years of Origin Collectors' Edition, News Magazines, Surry Hills, Sydney

References

External links
2002 State of Origin at sportsphotography.net

State of Origin series
State of Origin series